Harriswood Crescent is a historic series of rowhouses at 60-88 Harold Street in the Roxbury neighborhood of Boston, Massachusetts. It consists of 15 units designed by J. Williams Beal and built in 1890. The Tudor Revival buildings are remarkably unaltered, and retain their park-like setting. They are -story structures, built out of stone, brick, and stucco with half-timbering. The layout is a modern echo of a style propounded by Charles Bulfinch, most visible in Boston's Tontine Crescent.

The crescent was listed on the National Register of Historic Places in 1986.

See also
 National Register of Historic Places listings in southern Boston, Massachusetts

References

Houses in Boston
Roxbury, Boston
National Register of Historic Places in Boston
Houses on the National Register of Historic Places in Suffolk County, Massachusetts